Operation Toan Thang III ("Complete Victory") was a U.S. Army and Army of the Republic of Vietnam (ARVN) operation conducted between 17 February and 31 October 1969 in the Vietnam War. The operation was designed to keep pressure on Vietcong (VC) and People's Army of Vietnam (PAVN) forces in III Corps.

Background
The operation was a continuation of Operation Toan Thang II in the same operational area and with largely the same forces.

Operation

February

At 11:00 the aerorifle troops engaged an enemy force killing 21 PAVN/VC and capturing one and five individual and one crew-served weapons; U.S. losses were one killed.

The enemy withdrew at dawn leaving 28 PAVN/VC dead and three individual and four crew-served weapons.

A sweep of the area found 27 PAVN/VC dead and one captured and five individual and six crew-served weapons. At 02:00 a base camp of the 3rd Brigade, 25th Infantry Division received 95 rounds of 82/120mm mortar fire and 40 rounds of 107/122mm rocket fire followed by a ground attack which continued until the enemy withdrew at 06:30 leaving eight dead; U.S. losses were one killed. The defenders were supported by artillery and AC-47 Spooky gunship fire killing 78 PAVN/VC and capturing one and seven individual weapons and one light machinegun; U.S. losses were one killed. At 03:30 a firebase 6 miles southeast of Dầu Tiếng occupied by a unit of the 3rd Brigade, 25th Infantry Division received 150 rounds of mortar and Rocket-propelled grenade (RPG) fire followed by a ground attack. The enemy withdrew after an hour leaving 25 dead, five captured, five individual and five crew-served weapons; U.S. losses were one killed. A nearby sampan was found to contain a munitions cache.

On 26 February as part of the Tet 1969 attacks, at 03:00, a force of approximately 400 men from the VC 275th Regiment, 5th Division, had infiltrated into the tiny village of Thai Hiep on the outskirts of Biên Hòa. About 85 per cent of the force was estimated to be PAVN soldiers. At about 03:00, as reconnaissance elements of the unit were observed and engaged by United States Air Force (USAF) security forces at the perimeter of Bien Hoa Air Base, the villagers began to flee their homes, running down streets and creek beds. The villagers told the ARVN forces how they were driven out of their homes and confined to an area near a creek running alongside the village. At that time, the air base security forces reported that they had lost contact with the enemy reconnaissance element which withdrew east toward Thai Hiep. The ARVN units swiftly moved into blocking positions, and by daybreak, the PAVN/VC were surrounded. Additional RF elements moved in and the ARVN troops continued to contain the PAVN/VC forces until 11:00 when assault forces, in the form of the ARVN 36th Ranger Battalion, reinforced the contact. By 15:00 the 36th Ranger Battalion moved into the village attacking the PAVN/VC force. The series of assaults met heavy resistance by the battalion of PAVN who had turned the villagers' sandbagged shelters into a series of well-fortified defensive positions. ARVN psychological operations units broadcast repeated loud-speaker appeals and warnings, and all of the remaining villagers and several wounded PAVN/VC evacuated out of Thai Riep. Just after 16:00 USAF F-100s and F-4s along with Republic of Vietnam Air Force A-1 Skyraiders were directed against the PAVN/VC positions in the village. Following the employment of the supporting fires, the 36th Ranger Battalion moved back into the village. The Rangers met only slight, disorganized resistance. By 01:00 the next morning, the bodies of 264 PAVN/VC soldiers lay in the village and 87 had been captured or surrendered. More than 100 individual and crew-served weapons were captured. ARVN casualties were ten killed and 100 wounded and one US Army photographer was killed. The prisoners revealed that their mission had been to attack Biên Hòa city and the Bien Hoa Air Base. The unit was later reinforced by a unit from the 3rd Brigade, 25th Infantry Division and together they killed 46 PAVN/VC, destroyed 150 bunkers and captured one individual and two crew-served weapons.

Artillery fire was directed onto the bunkers and 50 secondary explosions were observed. A later search of the area found 38 PAVN/VC dead; U.S. losses were one killed.

Infantry from the 1st Brigade, 25th Infantry Division reinforced and the enemy withdrew in the afternoon leaving 28 dead and one captured and five individual and one crew-served weapons; U.S. losses were two killed.

Operational results for the month were 1,689 PAVN/VC killed and 288 captured and 522 individual and 185 crew-served weapons captured. U.S. losses were 130 killed.

March
An aerial observer saw 28 PAVN/VC dead in the strike area and two bunkers, 12 structures and 11 sampans destroyed. The unit was reinforced at 16:20 by another squadron unit and supported by artillery and helicopter gunships. The enemy withdrew at 18:00 leaving 19 dead and one captured; U.S. losses were two killed.

On 3 March at 04:55 three 122mm rockets hit Saigon killing 12 civilians. At 20:55 five 92mm mortar rounds landed near the Newport Bridge causing minimal damage.
At 08:15 another Brigade unit was air-assaulted into the area and at 12:30 mechanized infantry also joined the battle which continued into the night. At 04:45 on 5 March the PAVN assaulted the U.S. positions before finally withdrawing at dawn. PAVN losses were 179 killed and 68 weapons captured; U.S. losses were 11 killed. An hour later infantry from the 1st Infantry Division were air-assaulted into the area and other Regiment units joined the battle forcing the enemy to withdraw leaving 23 dead and 12 captured and two crew-served weapons.

The battle continued until the enemy withdrew at 19:00 leaving 21 dead; U.S. losses were four killed. On 6 March at 06:00 six 122mm rockets hit Saigon killing 22 civilians and destroying 17 houses. The enemy withdrew after 30 minutes leaving nine dead and three captured and eight individual and two crew-served weapons. The unit returned fire supported by artillery and helicopter gunships and the enemy withdrew; U.S. loses were seven killed.

The company attacked the bunkers supported by artillery, helicopter gunships and airstrikes killing 24 PAVN/VC; U.S. losses were two killed. At midday a unit of the 11th ACR found a weapons cache 4 miles west of Phước Vĩnh containing 20 107mm rockets, 11 light machine guns, an 82mm mortar and three AK-47s.

On 11 March at 00:05 the Nhà Bè Fuel Farm was hit by five 107mm rockets causing minimal damage. The unit returned fire supported by artillery, helicopter gunships and AC-47 fire. The PAVN withdrew after an hour leaving 38 dead, three captured and ten weapons. The enemy withdrew after two hours leaving 86 dead and four captured and 28 individual and three crew-served weapons; U.S. losses were five killed. The enemy withdrew at dusk leaving 76 dead and two captured and three crew-served weapons.

At 14:30 five 107mm rockets hit Dầu Tiếng Base Camp killing four Vietnamese civilian workers.

The unit returned fire supported by artillery, helicopter gunships and airstrikes and the enemy withdrew at 17:00 leaving 14 dead. On 16 March at 02:30 four 122mm rockets hit Saigon causing minimal damage. At 12:15 a unit from the 1st Brigade, 1st Cavalry Division operating 6 miles southwest of Hiệp Hòa found a munitions cache containing 13 107mm rockets and 90 RPG grenades. At 14:00 a unit from the armored cavalry squadron of the 25th Infantry Division operating 9 miles northeast of Go Dau Ha was attacked by an enemy force. The unit returned fire supported by artillery, helicopter gunships and airstrikes and the enemy withdrew at 16:30 leaving 11 dead.

The unit returned fire supported by artillery and helicopter gunships until the enemy withdrew at 05:45 leaving 30 dead and one individual and two crew-served weapons. At the same time two enemy platoons conducted a ground probe against the night defensive position of a unit of the 3rd Brigade, 1st Cavalry Division 9 miles northeast of Biên Hòa. The unit returned fire supported by artillery and helicopter gunships until the enemy withdrew at 05:15 leaving 33 dead and nine AK-47s and one light machine gun.

The unit returned fire supported by artillery and helicopter gunships and the enemy withdrew after one hour leaving 32 dead and 14 individual and six crew-served weapons; U.S. losses were two killed. At 11:45 a unit from the 3rd Brigade, 1st Cavalry Division patrolling 5 miles northeast of Trảng Bàng found graves containing ten PAVN/VC, all had been killed in the previous two days. At 18:10 a unit of the 11th ACR received fire 5 miles northeast of Dầu Tiếng and returned fire supported by artillery and helicopter gunships. The enemy withdrew after 20 minutes leaving 20 dead and one captured. At 20:30 a unit of the 2nd Brigade, 1st Infantry Division engaged an enemy force 6 miles east of Dầu Tiếng supported by artillery, helicopter gunships and an AC-47. The enemy withdrew after two hours leaving  ten dead and one RPG launcher; U.S. losses were one killed.

The unit returned fire supported by artillery and helicopter gunships in an action that continued for about 2 hours, resulting in 26 PAVN/VC killed for the loss of one U.S. killed. As the contact continued, other mounted elements of the 11th ACR reinforced, using armored personnel carriers and tanks. The enemy employed heavy small arms, machine gun and RPG fire. Helicopter gunships and a unit of the 2nd Brigade, 1st Cavalry Division also reinforced the contact. Fighting continued until about 19:30. A search of the area found 70 PAVN/VC bodies, along with 48 individual weapons, U.S. casualties were one killed. The unit returned fire with their organic weapons including .50 cal machine guns on their armored personnel carriers and artillery and helicopter gunships and an AC-47 gunship supported the unit until contact was lost at about 02:20. The bodies of 26 PAVN/VC were found in the area around the perimeter together with six individual and two crew-served weapons.

The unit returned fire with organic weapons and were supported by helicopter gunships and AC-119 gunships in an action that lasted two hours. The bodies of seven PAVN/VC were found, while U.S. losses were two killed. A ground attack followed at about 03:45. The unit returned fire with organic weapons and were supported by artillery and helicopter gunships along with AC-47 gunships. The enemy broke contact at about 06:45. PAVN/VC losses were five killed while U.S. losses were ten killed, among those killed was Specialist 4 Donald R. Johnston who smothered the blasts of three enemy-thrown explosives with his body, actions for which he was posthumously awarded the medal of Honor.

The action continued for about three hours with helicopter gunships supporting the unit until the PAVN/VC withdrew leaving ten dead and one individual and one crew-served weapons. Contact was lost at about 16:30, 31 PAVN/VC were killed and 2 captured, U.S. losses were one killed. Troops from the 2nd Brigade, 1st Cavalry Division, sweeping the area, engaged an enemy force about 20 minutes later and the action continued for 30 minutes before the PAVN/VC withdrew. 12 PAVN/VC were killed and one 82mm mortar was destroyed, U.S. casualties were one killed. The PAVN/VC withdrew leaving ten dead. Helicopter gunships and artillery supported the infantry and another unit of the brigade reinforced. Contact continued until about 15:20, PAVN/VC losses were unknown, while the U.S. lost three killed.

The unit returned fire with organic weapons and called for artillery support. The enemy broke contact at about 23:00. The bodies of 34 PAVN/VC and six individual and three crew-served weapons were found. Tactical air support was also called in until the enemy withdrew leaving 22 dead.

The bodies of 11 PAVN/VC and were found and two AK-47s and one 12.7mm machine gun. Tactical air strikes were also directed onto the location and aerofifle troops assaulted into the area found five destroyed 3/4 ton trucks near a bunker complex. The action continued until about 16:40 resulting in 18 PAVN/VC killed and three individual and one crew-served weapon captured. Within 15 minutes, troops from the Division's armored cavalry squadron arrived in tanks and armored personnel carriers to reinforce the convoy. Sporadic contact continued until 19:00 with the PAVN losing 85 killed and 19 AK-47 rifles, one 82mm mortar, five light machine guns and 2 RPG-2 launchers captured; US losses were two killed, including First lieutenant Stephen Holden Doane who was killed while destroying an enemy bunker, an action for which he was posthumously awarded the Medal of Honor.

The unit responded with organic weapons and artillery, helicopter gunship and AC-47 supporting fires. The enemy withdrew after an hour leaving two dead in the barbed wire and two individual and one crew-served weapons. U.S. losses were eight killed. The troops were reinforced at 14:00 and helicopter gunships, artillery and tactical air support was given. Contact was lost at 15:10, U.S. losses were two killed while PAVN/VC losses were unknown.

On 27 March two Army helicopters were destroyed in the operational area. The defenders returned fire supported by an AC-47 gunship and helicopter gunships. The enemy broke contact three hours later leaving eight dead and two crew-served weapons; U.S. losses were four killed. Other armored cavalry and mechanized infantry units reinforced and supporting fires from artillery, helicopter gunships and tactical air strikes were provided in a battle that continued until 15:00. PAVN/VC losses were 66 killed and 18 individual and 3 crew-served weapons captured while U.S. losses were three killed. The contact continued for about 2.5 hours and PAVN/VC losses were 10 killed and two captured. About 1 hour prior to the contact, a UH-1 helicopter gunship was hit by ground fire and crashed in the same general area.

The unit was supported by artillery, helicopter gunships and tactical airstrikes until the enemy withdrew at 10:00 leaving 19 dead and two individual and two crew-served weapons. U.S. losses were eight killed while PAVN/VC losses were unknown. Contact was lost at about 19:30. In a sweep of the area the next day the bodies of 36 PAVN/VC were found. U.S. losses were two killed. At 14:40 mechanized infantry from the 1st Brigade, 1st Infantry Division located a weapons cache 4 miles east of Quần Lợi Base Camp.

In the hourlong battle eight PAVN/VC were killed and two AK-47s and one light machine gun were captured; U.S. losses were three killed. The PAVN lost 30 killed and four AK-47s captured while U.S. losses were eight killed. At 10:00 the 1st Cavalry Division's Phước Vĩnh Base Camp received five rounds of 107mm rocket fire, artillery was directed onto the launch site resulting in a secondary explosion. At 11:30 1/9th Cavalry helicopter gunships engaged ten PAVN 6 miles east-northeast of Phú Cường killing all ten. Another element of the squadron killed a further 38 PAVN in the same area at the same time.

Cumulative operational results to the end of March were 5,520 PAVN/VC killed, 842 captured and 1,451 individual and 419 crew-served weapons captured. U.S. losses were 414 killed.

April
On 5 April an estimated PAVN battalion attacked a firebase occupied by a unit of the 2nd Brigade, 25th Infantry Division 11 km south of Go Dau Ha. The attack was repulsed with the PAVN losing 73 killed and ten individual and one crew-served weapon captured; U.S. losses were four killed.

On 11 April the MACV and USASF Compounds in Tây Ninh received 40 107mm rockets. Ammunition storage areas at both locations are ignited. Casualties were 30 RF killed, five civilians killed, 50 detainees, prisoners, and draft dodgers killed, 15 trucks and two gas tankers destroyed, 22,000 kg of rice, 130,000 liters of petroleum products, and an estimated 372 tons of ammunition destroyed.

On 15 April Patrol Base Diamond III 10 km southwest of Go Dau Ha occupied by the 2nd Battalion, 27th Infantry Regiment was attacked. The attack was repulsed with 198 PAVN/VC killed and eight captured and 40 individual and 42 crew-served weapons captured; U.S. losses were 13 killed.

On 16 April elements of the 4th Battalion, 23rd Infantry Regiment found 93 PAVN bodies 20 km northwest of Ben Soi, killed by tactical airstrikes on 6 April.

On 26 April a firebase occupied by a unit of the 1st Brigade, 25th Infantry Division 20 km south of Tây Ninh was hit by 300 rounds of 82mm mortar and 107mm rocket fire and then attacked by an estimated two battalions. The base was supported by artillery and helicopter and fixed wing gunships and 213 PAVN/VC were killed, six captured and 35 individual and 15 crew-served weapons captured. Mechanized infantry of the 3rd Brigade, 9th Infantry Division engaged an enemy force 5 km southeast of Tân An killing 63 PAVN/VC and capturing four individual and six crew-served weapons; U.S. losses were two killed.

On 27 April and estimated battalion assaults a night defensive position of a unit of the 2nd Brigade, 25th Infantry Division 10 km northeast of Trảng Bàng. The attack was repulsed with 100 PAVN/VC killed and one captured and 32 individual and 23 crew-served weapons captured; U.S. losses were ten killed.

May

PAVN/VC losses were 11 killed and one captured; U.S. losses were four killed.

An infantry unit reinforced the armor and artillery and helicopter gunships also engaged. The enemy withdrew at 13:00 leaving 19 dead and 9 captured; U.S. losses were one killed. At 17:30 an OH-6 was shot down 5 miles southeast of Lai Khê, both crewmembers were killed.

At 18:30 infantry from the 3rd Brigade, 1st Infantry Division engaged an enemy force 9 miles west of Bến Cát killing six and capturing four AK-47s; U.S. losses were one killed. Contact was lost at 12:10, U.S. losses were three killed, enemy losses were unknown. At 11:45 a unit of the 3rd Brigade, 82nd Airborne Division engaged an enemy unit 9 miles east of Trảng Bàng, the engagement continued until 12:50, PAVN/VC losses were 16 killed and four individual and one crew-served weapons captured.

The contact continued until 06:00 when the enemy withdrew leaving 101 dead and 29 captured and 47 individual and 23 crew-served weapons captured; U.S. losses were nine killed. Helicopter gunships and artillery were called in on the direction of fire with unknown results. The observer counted 15 dead in the impact area.

The engagement continued until 17:30 resulting in 29 PAVN killed and one U.S. killed. The battle continued until 18:45 and resulted in 102 PAVN killed and one captured and eight individual weapons and one light machinegun captured; U.S. losses were two killed.

At 21:40 mechanized infantry from the 2nd Brigade, 25th Infantry Division in a night defensive position 6 miles northeast of Trảng Bàng received a ground attack by a PAVN platoon. 35 PAVN were killed and 11 individual and one crew-served weapons were captured. The enemy were pursued and contact reestablished at 06:30 and an element of the 1st Australian Task Force reinforced with tanks and armored personnel carriers, killing a further 14 and capturing four more individual weapons. At 14:15 helicopters from 1/9th Cavalry engaged a bunker complex supported by tactical airstrikes, killing 13 and destroying four huts and a .50 cal machine gun.

The action continued until 05:20 when the enemy withdrew leaving one dead and one SKS rifle; U.S. losses were two killed. At 03:00 the base received 200 rounds of 82mm mortar and 107mm rocket fire followed by a ground assault. The attackers penetrated part of the base and engaged U.S. helicopter gunships with 12.7 machineguns. The battle continued until 06:15 when the enemy withdrew leaving 73 dead; U.S. losses were seven killed. Helicopter gunships and AC-47 gunship fire was directed onto the enemy location and they responded with 12.7mm machinegun fire. A sweep of the area found 28 PAVN killed and eight individual and one crew-served weapon. Artillery, helicopter and fixed wing gunship support was provided and the enemy withdrew at 04:45 leaving 45 dead and eight RPG launchers and six individual weapons; U.S. losses were seven killed. The battle continued until 07:00 when the enemy withdrew leaving 33 dead and two flamethrowers. The unit was supported by artillery, helicopter gunships and tactical air strikes and the ARVN 50th Regiment, 25th Division. The battle continued until morning when the enemy withdrew leaving 83 dead, seven light machineguns, six AK-47s and five RPG launchers; U.S. losses were two killed. In the Rung Sat Special Zone VC attacked five ships on the Long Tau channel causing superficial damage.

The enemy withdrew at 14:15 leaving 50 dead and 18 individual and eight crew-served weapons; U.S. losses were three killed. The battle continued until 06:00 when the PAVN withdrew leaving 51 dead and four captured and 17 individual and six crew-served weapons; U.S. losses were two killed. The unit received support from mechanized infantry, artillery and helicopter gunships killing 34 PAVN and capturing 13 AK-47s and three RPG launchers. Contact was lost at 17:35 with 13 PAVN/VC killed.

On 18 May at 01:00 a unit of the 54th Artillery Group at Xuân Lộc Base Camp was attacked. The unit was supported by helicopter and fixed wing gunships and a unit of the 11th ACR. Fighting continued until 06:00 resulting in 24 PAVN killed and 14 U.S. killed. At 12:45 in the same general area infantry from the 2nd Brigade, 25th Infantry Division engaged an enemy force in a battle that continued until 17:50 resulting in 14 PAVN/VC killed and four AK-47s captured. At 13:15 Dầu Tiếng Base Camp received 10 rounds of 82mm mortar fire and artillery fire was directed onto the firing position, a later search found two dead PAVN/VC.

The contact continued until 18:00 and resulted in 16 PAVN/VC killed and seven individual weapons captured. At 16:00 infantry from the 3rd Brigade, 9th Infantry Division engaged an enemy force 6 miles southwest of Rach Kien killing 12 PAVN/VC and capturing two individual weapons.

The unit was reinforced by another RF unit and at 09:30 by mechanized infantry from the 1st Brigade, 1st Infantry Division. The PAVN withdrew at 15:00 leaving 53 dead, two individual weapons, 2 12.7mm machineguns and one 57mm recoilless rifle; U.S. losses were two killed, there were no ARVN losses.

The contact continued until 18:00 resulting in 15 PAVN/VC killed and two 12.7mm machineguns, two 82mm mortars and one RPG launcher captured; U.S. losses were one killed. Contact was lost at 18:50 with 14 PAVN/VC killed and one AK-47 captured; U.S. losses were one killed. Mechanized infantry joined the contact which continued until 16:40. A search of the area found 96 PAVN dead and captured one and 24 AK-47s, one light machinegun, three 75mm recoilless rifles, two 57mm recoilless rifles and two 60mm mortars; U.S. losses were two killed. Staff Sergeant James Leroy Bondsteel was awarded the medal of Honor for destroying ten PAVN bunkers during the battle. Artillery and helicopter and fixed-wing gunship fire was directed onto the area and the bodies of 20 PAVN/VC were found in the strike area.

A search of the bunker complex found 148 107/122mm rockets, 68 tons of rice and 10 tons of salt.

Mechanized infantry later arrived and the enemy withdrew at 11:20 with unknown losses; U.S. losses were one killed. An OH-6 was shot down in Hậu Nghĩa Province. The ARVN 52nd Regiment, 18th Division reinforced and the battle continued until 16:00 resulting in 18 PAVN/VC killed and four individual weapons captured; U.S. losses were one killed, there no ARVN losses.

The PAVN/VC lost 59 killed and 30 AK-47s and 13 crew-served weapons were captured; U.S. losses were one killed. Later that day the same unit found a munitions in the same area. At 14:45 a unit of the 11th ACR engaged an entrenched enemy force 9 miles southeast of Xuân Lộc and killed 21 PAVN/VC and captured one. On 31 May at 10:15 a unit of the 3rd Brigade, 25th Infantry Division sweeping an area 6 miles southeast of Bến Cát engaged a PAVN force killing 14 and capturing nine individual and one crew-served weapons.

Cumulative operational results to the end of May were 13,959 PAVN/VC killed, 1,992 captured and 3,739 individual and 1004 crew-served weapons captured. U.S. losses were 894 killed.

June
Supporting arms were called in an the enemy eventually withdrew at 17:45 leaving 29 dead; U.S. losses were two killed, including First lieutenant Robert Leslie Poxon who was later posthumously awarded the Medal of Honor.

At 17:15 the 1/9th Cavalry observed 26 dead PAVN 6 miles southeast of Phú Cường killed by airstrikes earlier that day. A UH-1 was shot down 1 mile northwest of Phước Vĩnh killing all seven on board.

On 5 June at 12:50 a unit of the 2nd Brigade, 25th Infantry Division and a unit of the ARVN 49th Regiment, 25th Division engaged a PAVN force 6 miles northeast of Trảng Bàng in an engagement that continued until the evening. PAVN losses were 72 killed and 21 individual and four crew-served weapons captured. An RF unit was landed by U.S. Navy riverine boats and engaged the PAVN killing 15 for no losses.

On the night of 5/6 June PAVN/VC forces conducted attacks by fire and ground attacks on numerous bases throughout II Corps and III Corps. On the night of 5 June, sensors at Firebase Crook 18 km northwest of Tây Ninh detected movements outside the base wire. The base was occupied by the 3rd Battalion, 22nd Infantry Regiment and the 7th Battalion, 11th Field Artillery Regiment. Artillery fire was directed onto the firing position and a search of the area found three dead PAVN/VC. The attackers withdrew at 06:10 leaving 14 dead and five captured. The battle continued until 05:30 when the enemy withdrew leaving eight dead and one AK-47; U.S. losses were one killed. The attackers withdrew at 04:00 leaving seven dead and three captured and five individual weapons and 15 RPG rounds; U.S. losses were two killed. At 03:00 PAVN mortar fire hit Firebase Crook followed by an assault on the southern and eastern perimeters by elements of the PAVN 272nd Regiment with 16 managing to penetrate the perimeter before being forced out. AC-47 and AC-119 gunships were called in and forced the attackers to retreat. At 10:55 mechanized infantry from the 1st Brigade, 1st Infantry Division engaged an entrenched enemy company 3 miles northwest of An Lộc. Supporting arms and more mechanized infantry joined the battle which continued until 15:00 when the enemy withdrew leaving 115 dead and nine captured and 26 individual and ten crew-served weapons; U.S. losses were three killed. The unit was joined by mechanized infantry of the 3rd Brigade, 1st Infantry Division and the enemy withdrew at 14:40 leaving 49 dead and one captured.

At 02:00 on 7 June a Night Hawk helicopter detected movement near Firebase Crook and artillery fire was directed against the suspected PAVN positions. At 03:00 a PAVN rocket and artillery barrage began to hit the base and then at 04:30 two battalions of the PAVN 88th Regiment attacked the northern perimeter but were forced back by gunship fire. PAVN losses in this attack were 323 killed without loss among U.S. forces. Artillery, helicopter gunships and airstrikes were provided in support and the enemy withdrew at 16:45 leaving 41 dead and seven individual and seven crew-served weapons; U.S. losses were two killed. The units were reinforced by another 11th ACR unit and artillery, helicopter gunships and airstrikes were provided in support. The PAVN withdrew at 16:30 leaving 95 dead and 22 AK-47s, five RPG-2s, four RPG-7s, one 60mm mortar and one 57mm recoilless rifle; U.S. losses were three killed.

On the night of 7/8 June a third weak assault was made against Firebase Crook and quickly repulsed. Artillery, helicopter gunships and airstrikes were provided in support and the enemy withdrew at 16:15 leaving 36 dead and three individual and one crew-served weapons; U.S. losses were one killed. At 13:30 a unit of the 11th ACR engaged an enemy force 5 miles northwest of An Lộc. The unit was supported by helicopter gunships and joined by mechanized infantry from the 1st Brigade, 1st Infantry Division. The enemy withdrew at 16:30 leaving nine dead and five individual and one crew-served weapons; U.S. losses were four killed. The unit was reinforced by other Brigade troopers and a unit of the 11th ACR. The enemy withdrew at 18:20 leaving 15 dead; U.S. losses were three killed. Artillery and helicopter and fixed-wing gunships were provided in support and the enemy withdrew at 19:00 leaving 51 dead; U.S. losses were three killed. At 15:10 armored cavalry from the 25th Infantry Division engaged an enemy force 3 miles north of Trảng Bàng. Another unit of the squadron joined the action and artillery, helicopter gunships and airstrikes were provided in support. The enemy withdrew at 19:00 leaving 26 dead and seven individual weapons.

On 11 June at 08:55 unit of the 3rd Brigade, 25th Infantry Division engaged an enemy force 8 miles southeast of Phú Cường. The enemy withdrew at 09:30 but the Brigade unit joined by mechanized infantry pursued and reengaged at 12:30 supported by artillery, helicopter gunships and airstrikes. At 19:15 the enemy withdrew leaving 56 dead and three capture and four individual and three crew-served weapons; U.S. losses were two killed.

The attackers withdrew at 04:55 leaving 35 dead and two captured and 22 individual weapons. Prisoner interrogation revealed that the attackers were from the VC 27th Regiment, 5th Division. The enemy withdrew at dawn but were pursued by the U.S. unit who lost contact at 08:50. Nine PAVN/VC were killed and five individual and two crew-served weapons captured. Artillery, helicopter gunships and airstrikes were provided in support until the enemy withdrew at 14:40 leaving 23 dead and nine individual and three crew-served weapons. The enemy withdrew at 21:55 leaving 16 dead and three individual weapons. A UH-1 was shot down 3 miles northwest of Củ Chi.

The enemy withdrew at 18:15 leaving 40 dead and two individual and five crew-served weapons; U.S. losses were one killed.

On 16 June at 01:30 helicopter gunships from the 1/9th Cavalry attacked an enemy campsite, 12 bodies were later seen in the area. Artillery and helicopter gunship support was provided and the enemy withdrew at 18:50 leaving 9 dead; U.S. losses were one killed and one Kit Carson Scout killed. The PAVN withdrew at 07:05 leaving nine dead and two individual and one crew-served weapons. Helicopter gunships and airstrikes hit the area and the troops were landed and searched the area finding 32 PAVN/VC dead and six individual and seven crew-served weapons.

The defenders were supported by helicopter gunship and AC-47 fire and the PAVN withdrew at 03:30 leaving 37 dead and three captured and 11 individual and three crew-served weapons; U.S. losses were three killed. Other U.S. units joined the battle and helicopter gunships and airstrikes were given in support and the PAVN withdrew at 11:30 leaving 31 dead and three individual and five crew-served weapons. A UH-1 was shot down 3 miles northwest of An Lộc killing two on board 

At 02:20 a barrage of mortar and RPG fire hit the base followed by an attack by fire. The defenders fought back supported by artillery and AC-47 and AC-119 fire. The attackers withdrew at 04:00 leaving 35 dead and six captured and 13 individual and eight crew-served weapons. The enemy withdrew at 20:30 leaving 85 dead; U.S. losses were two killed. The enemy withdrew at 13:20 leaving 57 dead and three individual and 12 crew-served weapons. At 17:35 mechanized infantry of the 1st Brigade, 25th Infantry Division attack an enemy force on the northeast of Tây Ninh. The enemy withdrew at 18:00 leaving 18 dead and three AK-47s and one 2mm mortar. At 22:15 helicopters from the 12th Combat Aviation Group attacked an enemy force 6 miles southwest of Tây Ninh killing 15.

At 01:30 the base was attacked by a reinforced PAVN battalion of the 1st Division. The defenders fought back supported by artillery and AC-47 fire. The PAVN withdrew at 02:45 leaving 90 dead and 33 individual and 21 crew-served weapons; U.S. losses were seven killed. The unit was reinforced by mechanized infantry and supported by helicopter gunship and AC-47 fire. The enemy withdrew at 23:00 leaving 29 dead and two captured and 15 individual and one crew-served weapon; U.S. losses were one killed.

Artillery fire was directed onto the complex and the enemy withdrew leaving 18 dead and two individual and three crew-served weapons. A USAF C-130 was shot down while on approach to Katum killing all six on board.

An OH-6 was shot down in Hậu Nghĩa Province killing both crewmen. On 25 June at 08:30 the 1/9th Cavalry engaged 20–5 entrenched enemy soldiers 7 miles southeast of Phước Vĩnh, the aerorifle platoon was landed and found 13 dead and two individual weapons. On 26 June a USAF FAC saw nine enemy dead and seven destroyed bunkers in an area hit by airstrikes 9 miles southwest of Bến Cát.

Artillery, helicopter gunships and an AC-47 provided supporting fire and the enemy withdrew at 06:30 leaving 32 dead and three captured and two RPG launchers; one Kit Carson Scout was killed. The enemy withdrew at 14:30 leaving 62 dead and 23 AK-47s and two crew-served weapons; U.S. losses were one killed. The unit was reinforced by mechanized infantry and an RF unit with artillery and helicopter gunship support. The enemy withdrew at 13:35 leaving 39 dead, 15 AK-47s and two RPG-2 launchers and 100 RPG-2 grenades; U.S. losses were four killed including Staff sergeant Hammett L. Bowen Jr. who smothered the blast of a hand grenade with his body, an action for which he was posthumously awarded the Medal of Honor. At 12:35 mechanized infantry of the 3rd Brigade, 25th Infantry Division engaged and enemy platoon in Long An Province killing 24 and capturing six individual weapons; U.S. losses were three killed. At 19:05 an aerial observer directed artillery fire onto an enemy unit 5 miles northeast of Trảng Bàng killing 11 PAVN/VC.

Cumulative operational results to the end of June were 18,598 PAVN/VC killed, 2,434 captured and 4,869 individual and 1,310 crew-served weapons captured. U.S. losses were 1,122 killed.

July
Artillery, helicopter gunship and air support was provided and another mechanized infantry unit joined the battle. The enemy withdrew at 13:45 leaving 44 dead and 11 individual and one crew-served weapons; U.S. losses were one killed.

Artillery and air strikes were directed onto the enemy positions and the following day the troops searched the bunkers finding 32 PAVN/VC dead. Two OH-6’s were shot down in Tây Ninh Province.

The enemy withdrew at 18:00 with unknown losses while U.S. losses were nine killed including Corporal Michael Fleming Folland who smothered the blast of a hand grenade with his body, an action for which he was posthumously awarded the Medal of Honor. Helicopter gunship, artillery and airstrikes were directed on the area and the enemy withdrew leaving 36 dead and four individual and two crew-served weapons; U.S. losses were three killed.

The enemy withdrew at 17:00 leaving 19 dead and three individual weapons; U.S. losses were three killed. Mortar, artillery and helicopter gunship fire was directed onto the firing site and 11 PAVN/VC dead were observed at the site.

A UH-1 was shot down in Bình Dương Province killing all four on board.

Escorts from the 11th ACR engaged the attacked and were joined by other units of the regiment and supported by artillery, helicopter gunships and airstrikes. The PAVN withdrew at 16:00 leaving 22 dead and one captured; U.S. losses were four killed.

At 10:40 an observation helicopter of the armored cavalry squadron of the 25th Infantry Division drew fire and directed artillery and helicopter gunship fire onto the area, ten enemy bodies were observed in the strike area. The enemy withdrew at 20:00 leaving nine dead; U.S. losses were one killed. A prisoner captured in the fighting revealed under interrogation that some PAVN/VC forces were planning to revert to guerrilla and sapper tactics  due to heavy losses incurred in recent operations.

The unit was reinforced by other units attempted to block the enemy escape and artillery and airstrikes were directed into the area. The enemy withdrew at 17:30 leaving 32 dead; U.S. losses were four killed. The enemy withdrew at 16:00 leaving five dead; U.S. losses were two killed. A UH-1 was shot down in Long Khánh Province.

At 19:00 a unit of the 2nd Brigade, 25th Infantry Division found a 3 ton rice cache 9 miles northeast of Phú Cường.

A convoy security unit of the 11th ACR engaged the enemy and helicopter gunships and airstrikes hit the enemy positions. The enemy withdrew at 14:30 with unknown losses; U.S. losses were one killed.

The convoy escort from the 11th ACR and the ARVN 9th Regiment, 5th Division engaged the attackers supported by artillery fire and airstrikes and another unit of the 11th ACR joined the battle. The PAVN withdrew at 12:35 leaving eight dead and one captured. At 18:30 a 1/9th Cavalry helicopter was fired on by an estimated 14 PAVN/VC, the helicopter responded with machinegun fire and directed airstrikes onto the area and ten dead were observed in the strike area.

Artillery and airstrikes were called in and the PAVN withdrew at 19:15 leaving 47 dead and ten captured and 17 AK-47s and ten RPG launchers.

Further searches of the area found another 15 PAVN killed by airstrikes. At 07:30 a helicopter gunship of the 1st Cavalry Division received 12.7mm machinegun fire 4 miles south-southeast of Katum, the gunship engaged the position and called in airstrikes killing 11 PAVN/VC. At 12:20 a unit of the 3rd Brigade, 9th Infantry Division operating 4 miles south of Bến Lức engaged with an enemy force killing 12 and capturing one individual and two crew-served weapons.

At 21:30 Rangers from the 3rd Brigade, 9th Infantry Division ambushed six PAVN/VC on two sampans 6 miles northwest of Tân An killing all six.

At 20:45 an enemy force was observed near Dầu Tiếng Base Camp, mechanized infantry and armored forces from the 1st Brigade, 1st Infantry Division deployed to the area and engaged the enemy supported by artillery and AC-47 gunship fire. The enemy withdrew at 04:30 leaving 14 dead and 11 individual weapons. At 18:40 a unit of the 3rd Brigade, 9th Infantry Division engaged an enemy force 9 miles west-northwest of Tân An killing eight and capturing one individual weapon.

A USAF OV-10 Bronco was shot down in Bình Dương Province.

The enemy withdrew at 11:30 leaving 24 dead and 14 AK-47s and one 60mm mortar. An aerial observed later reported 24 dead in the strike area.

The fighting continued until 14:20 when the enemy withdrew leaving ten dead; U.S. losses were two killed. At 17:05 a mechanized unit from the 1st Brigade, 1st Infantry Division engaged an enemy force 5 miles southeast of Dầu Tiếng, the enemy withdrew after an hour leaving seven dead; U.S. losses were one killed.

U.S. Navy helicopter gunships supported the SEALs and the enemy withdrew at 06:00 leaving ten dead and four captured and four individual weapons. The CIDG were supported by artillery, helicopter gunships and airstrikes and then at 15:00 by a unit of the 3rd Brigade, 25th infantry Division. The enemy withdrew at 18:30 leaving 63 dead, U.S. losses were nine killed. At 20:45 a patrol from the 2nd Brigade, 25th Infantry Division directed artillery fire onto ten enemy soldiers 4 miles northeast of Trảng Bàng killing them all.

Helicopter gunships and airstrikes hit enemy positions killing seven PAVN/VC and capturing one crew-served weapon.

Cumulative operational results to the end of July were 21,446 PAVN/VC killed, 2,914 captured and 5,559 individual and 1,385 crew-served weapons captured. U.S. losses were 1,303 killed.

August

Artillery and helicopter gunship fire was directed onto the area and the enemy withdrew at 18:30 leaving 39 dead and seven captured and six individual and two crew-served weapons.

The enemy withdrew at 14:40 leaving 22 dead and ten individual and one crew-served weapons. The enemy withdrew at 14:30 leaving seven dead and four individual weapons; U.S. losses were one killed.

The enemy was reengaged at 17:10 and artillery helicopter and fixed wing gunship fire was directed onto them killing 11; U.S. losses were three killed. At 11:20 RF units and a unit of the 1st Brigade, 25th Infantry Division engaged an enemy force 4 miles west of Phú Cường, the skirmish continued until 15:00 when the enemy withdrew leaving nine dead. At 11:55 a light observation helicopter reconnoitring an area 4 miles southwest of Trảng Bàng drew ground fire and directed airstrikes onto the area, six PAVN/VC dead were seen in the strike area. At 16:10 a unit of the 3rd Brigade, 25th Infantry Division engaged an enemy force 4 miles southwest of Trảng Bàng killing nine. The 1/9th Cavalry operating in support of the 11th ACR killed a further six PAVN/VC in the same area.

At 11:45 helicopter gunships from 1/9th Cavalry attacked an estimated 90 PAVN/VC 9 miles west-northwest of An Lộc and also directed artillery and airstrikes onto the area killing 25. At 17:25 a unit of the 1st Brigade, 1st Cavalry Division was landed to reinforce and the PAVN withdrew shortly afterwards leaving 30 dead; U.S. losses were one killed. An OH-6 was shot down in the engagement killing all three on board.

At 13:10 helicopter gunships from the 11th ACR attacked an enemy company 9 miles northwest of An Lộc. Troops from the regiment were air-assaulted into the area and joined later by the 1/9th Cavalry and mechanized infantry from the ARVN 9th Regiment, 5th Division. The enemy withdrew at 16:30 leaving 31 dead and eight captured. At 17:00 an observation helicopter from the 12th Combat Aviation Group drew fire 9 miles west of Định Quán District, artillery and helicopter gunship fire was directed onto the area killing five PAVN/VC. On 11 August at 03:00 a unit of the 1st Brigade, 1st Cavalry Division in a night defensive position 7 miles southeast of Katum received 50 rounds of mixed 60/82mm mortar fire followed by a ground attack by a PAVN company. The defenders were supported by artillery, helicopter gunship and AC-47 and AC-119 fire. The PAVN withdrew after 40 minutes leaving 17 dead and assorted munitions; U.S. losses were four killed. A unit of the Brigade was air-assaulted into the area and engaged an estimated 50 PAVN/VC, after two hours the enemy withdrew leaving six dead; U.S. losses were two killed.

The attacked was repulsed with artillery and AC-47 gunship support resulting in 78 PAVN killed and two captured; U.S. losses were two killed. At 02:00 the base of the 3rd Brigade 1st Cavalry Division 4 miles northeast of An Lộc was attacked by a PAVN force composed of troops from the 271st and 272nd Regiments, 9th Division. At 04:30 the PAVN withdrew leaving 48 dead and seven captured; U.S. losses were three killed. At 02:05 a PAVN force attacked a night defensive position of a unit of the 11th ACR 5 miles south of Lộc Ninh resulting in 12 PAVN killed and one U.S. killed. At 02:15 an ambush patrol of the 3rd Brigade, 1st Cavalry Division 2 miles southeast of Quần Lợi engaged a 100-strong PAVN unit. Artillery and AC-47 fire support was provided and the PAVN withdrew at 03:40 leaving 23 dead and three individual and two crew-served weapons; U.S. losses were one killed. At 02:30 a firebase of the 11th ACR 4 miles south-southwest of An Lộc was attacked by PAVN, the attack continued until 04:00 when the PAVN withdrew leaving 32 dead and one captured; U.S. losses were one killed. The attack continued until 04:45 when the PAVN withdrew leaving 30 dead and one captured and 15 individual and one crew-served weapon; U.S. losses were two killed. The PAVN withdrew after 50 minutes leaving 59 dead and one 12.7mm machinegun, one 60mm mortar and two 82mm mortars; U.S. losses were 13 killed. At 07:10 a unit of the 3rd Brigade, 25th Infantry Division was air-assaulted into an area 4 miles north of Hiệp Hòa and immediately engaged an enemy force. Artillery, helicopter gunships and airstrikes were provided in support and other Brigade elements reinforced. The enemy withdrew at 19:40 leaving 16 dead and two individual and seven crew-served weapons; U.S. losses were four killed. The unit was reinforced by units of the division, the 11th ACR and the 3rd Brigade, 1st Cavalry Division. Th enemy withdrew after nine hours leaving 12 dead; U.S. losses were two killed. At 08:00 a unit of the 11th ACR received fire from a PAVN force 4 miles southwest of An Lộc, the PAVN withdrew but the unit reestablished contact at 13:00 and helicopter gunships and airstrikes supported the attack. The PAVN withdrew at 16:00 leaving 53 dead; U.S. losses were one killed. At 09:50 a unit of the 11th ACR engaged an enemy force 5 miles north of Lộc Ninh killing six in a seven hour long engagement. At 12:30 helicopter gunships of the 1st Brigade, 1st Cavalry Division engaged 25 PAVN/VC 4 miles south of Katum killing 17. At 15:30 mechanized infantry of the 3rd Brigade, 1st Infantry Division providing convoy security on Highway received fire 7 miles south of An Lộc. The engagement continued until 16:45 when the enemy withdrew leaving 61 dead and two captured; U.S. losses were two killed. The enemy withdrew at 19:00 leaving 16 dead and four AK-47s and one light machinegun; U.S. losses were four killed.

The PAVN withdrew at 16:20 leaving 79 dead and 20 AK-47s and seven RPG launchers; U.S. losses were two killed. The enemy withdrew within 15 minutes with unknown losses while the U.S. losses were one killed.

Fighting continued until 10:00 when the PAVN withdrew leaving 31 dead and one captured. At 13:10 a unit of the 11th ACR and the 34th Rangers engaged a PAVN unit 2 miles northeast of Lộc Ninh, the PAVN withdrew at 15:25 leaving 21 dead. The enemy withdrew after two hours leaving 23 dead and three individual and one crew-served weapons. At 21:30 a unit of the 3rd Brigade, 25th Infantry Division in night defensive positions 4 miles north of Hiệp Hòa received mortar fire followed by a ground attack. The unit fought back with organic weapons, artillery, helicopter gunship and AC-47 support. During the battle a UH-1 was shot down and crashed nearby killing all seven on board, PAVN/C losses were unknown.

The enemy withdrew at 18:30 leaving 31 dead and two 12.7mm machineguns. At 20:25 a firebase near Lộc Ninh occupied by a unit of the 11th ACR was attacked, the attackers withdrew after 15 minutes with unknown losses. The unit fought back supported by artillery and helicopter gunships. The enemy withdrew at 04:20 leaving ten dead and three individual and two crew-served weapons and 25 RPG-2 rounds.

At 14:30 a unit of the 1st Brigade, 1st Cavalry Division engaged an enemy unit 10 miles northeast of Phú Cường, the enemy withdrew after two hours leaving nine dead and three individual weapons; U.S. losses were one killed. The enemy withdrew at 22:10 leaving eight dead, however shortly afterwards helicopter gunships engaged an enemy force numbering 50-70 a mile away killing 33. An OH-6 was shot down 3 miles northwest of Phú Cường. At 15:40 helicopters from the 3rd Brigade, 9th Infantry Division attacked ten PAVN/VC 4 miles south of Bến Lức killing eight and capturing three individual weapons. At 17:55 a unit of the 1st Brigade, 1st Cavalry Division engaged an enemy force 9 miles southeast of Katum killing seven and capturing six individual weapons and two 107mm rockets.

On 19 August at 01:35 the Quần Lợi Base Camp occupied by the 3rd Brigade, 1st Cavalry Division was attacked. During the attack a tank gun was accidentally fired onto a reaction force in the northwest of the base killing nine U.S. soldiers. The enemy withdrew at 02:00 with unknown losses. The fighting continued until 14:30 when the enemy withdrew leaving 23 dead and three individual weapons; U.S. losses were five killed. The enemy withdrew again leaving 35 dead and two captured; U.S. losses were one killed.

The unit was supported by artillery, helicopter gunships and AC-47s. the enemy withdrew at 07:15 leaving 41 dead and three captured and four individual and three crew-served weapons. The PAVN withdrew at 14:00 leaving 11 dead and one captured and five AK-47s and one RPG launcher. At 16:55 a unit of the 2nd Brigade, 25th Infantry Division engaged an enemy force 3 miles east of Trảng Bàng, the enemy withdrew at 18:4 leaving six dead and one individual and one crew-served weapon. On 23 August at 12:50 a unit of the 3rd Brigade, 1st Cavalry Division found the graves of 40 PAVN/VC 4 miles west-southwest of Lộc Ninh, all had been killed by small arms fire in the preceding week.

Other Brigade units joined the battle and the enemy withdrew at 15:40, but the infantry pursued and reestablished contact until the enemy withdrew at 17:35 leaving 28 dead. A Ranger unit from the 3rd Brigade, 9th Infantry Division was then air-assaulted into the area and immediately engaged enemy forces, killing nine and capturing one, the prisoner identified one of the dead as Colonel Hai Tram, commander of PAVN/VC Sub-region 3. At midday a unit of the 2nd Brigade, 25th infantry Division engaged an enemy force 8 miles southwest of Bến Cát supported by artillery, helicopter gunships and airstrikes. The enemy withdrew at 18:45 leaving 48 dead and one captured and 21 individual weapons; U.S. losses were two killed. The same unit received more fire later that afternoon resulting in one U.S. killed.

At 13:30 a reconnaissance unit of the 1st Brigade, 1st Infantry Division engaged 15 soldiers in a bunker complex 8 miles south-southeast of Dầu Tiếng, the enemy withdrew after three hours leaving one dead; U.S. losses were three killed.

The enemy broke contact at 13:35 but the unit reestablished contact again at 13:50 and the enemy finally withdrew at 14:10 leaving 17 dead; U.S. losses were one killed. An OH-6 was shot down in Bình Dương Province. At 16:10 a unit of the 3rd Brigade, 9th Infantry Division found a munitions cache 7 miles northeast of Tân An containing 24 RPG rounds among other supplies.

The enemy withdrew at 18:40 leaving two dead and one individual weapon; U.S. losses were one killed. On 31 August at 09:55 a unit of the 1st Brigade, 1st Cavalry Division received fire from an entrenched PAVN force 6 miles south of Katum. Artillery, helicopter gunships and airstrikes hit the bunkers and the PAVN withdrew at 11:15 leaving three dead; U.S. losses were two killed. At 15:20 a unit of the 1st Brigade, 1st Cavalry Division engaged another entrenched PAVN force 6 miles south of Katum. Artillery and airstrikes were directed against the bunkers and the PAVN withdrew at 16:10 leaving 25 dead, two light machineguns and 15 RPG rounds; U.S. losses were two killed.

Cumulative operational results to the end of August were 24,899 PAVN/VC killed, 3,319 captured and 6,243 individual and 1,544 crew-served weapons captured. U.S. losses were 1,451 killed.

September
At 13:45 helicopter gunships of the 1st Brigade, 1st Cavalry Division observed two PAVN soldiers setting up rockets 12 miles north of Dầu Tiếng. The gunships attacked the position and called in artillery fire which resulted in five secondary explosions and 16 dead PAVN were seen in the strike area.

The defenders were supported by artillery, helicopter gunship and AC-47 fire and the PAVN withdrew leaving 19 dead and one captured; U.S. losses were one killed. The enemy withdrew at 03:10 leaving 37 dead and one captured; U.S. losses were one killed. The attackers withdrew at 04:40 leaving 13 dead and two individual and four crew-served weapons, 28 RPG rounds and a radio; U.S. losses were one killed. The attackers withdrew at 04:00 leaving eight dead; U.S. losses were two killed. At 06:30 an armored unit of the 25th Infantry Division operating 6 miles northeast of Tây Ninh received 15 rounds of 60mm mortar fire, artillery and helicopter gunship fire was directed onto the firing position and 13 dead PAVN/VC were later found in the strike area. At 09:10 a mechanized unit of the 1st Brigade, 25th Infantry Division engaged an enemy unit 9 miles northeast of Tây Ninh, the enemy withdrew at 15:00 leaving 30 dead; U.S. losses were one killed. At 19:15 a unit of the 2nd Brigade, 25th Infantry Division ambushed 30 PAVN/VC 6 miles north of Củ Chi killing five and capturing one individual weapon.

The landing zone then received mortar fire followed by ground probes. At 05:15 enemy sappers were seen in the perimeter wire and engaged by small arms, artillery, helicopter gunship and AC-119 fire. The enemy withdrew at 06:45 leaving 24 dead and one captured and one individual and two crew-served weapons; U.S. losses were three killed. The unit was supported by artillery, helicopter gunships and airstrikes and a unit of the ARVN 9th Regiment, 5th Division joined the battle. The PAVN withdrew at 15:15 leaving 70 dead and five captured, U.S. losses were three killed. Supporting fires were called in and the PAVN withdrew leaving 55 dead and four captured and eight AK-47s, three light machineguns, one RPG-2 launcher and one RPG-7 launcher and assorted munitions; U.S. losses were one killed. An OH-6 was shot down in Bình Dương Province.

At 15:15 a unit of the 11th ACR engaged a PAVN battalion 3 miles southwest of An Lộc, fighting continued until the PAVN withdrew at 19:10 leaving 42 dead and one individual weapon and two machineguns; U.S. losses were two killed. At 22:30 mechanized infantry of the 2nd Brigade, 25th Infantry Division detected PAVN/VC outside their perimeter and directed artillery fire onto the area killing five. At 02:40 further movement was detected and artillery fire called in killing another five PAVN/VC. A UH-1 was shot down 4 miles southwest of An Lộc killing two on board.

At 21:35 further mortar fire was followed by a ground probe, the unit returned fire and directed artillery onto the direction of attack and the enemy withdrew with unknown losses. The OH-6 crashed and the AH-1 engaged enemy force around the crash site until it was forced to crash-land. The aerorifle platoon was landed at the site and rescued the crews and damaged helicopters.

At 04:05 Phước Vĩnh Base Camp received rocket fire and at 05:15 12 PAVN probed the perimeter, withdrawing ten minutes later leaving four dead and two individual and two crew-served weapons. During the fighting a light observation helicopter was shot down killing one crewman. The enemy withdrew at 16:20 leaving one dead, U.S. losses were two dead in total. At 15:10 a unit of the 11th ACR engaged an enemy force 2 miles northwest of Lộc Ninh, supporting fires were provided and the enemy withdrew at 16:20 leaving 17 dead.

The enemy withdrew at 15:50 leaving 12 dead and two individual and one crew-served weapon. Artillery, helicopter gunship and AC-47 fire was directed onto the firing positions and a search of the area found 33 PAVN/VC dead and one captured together with seven individual and three crew-served weapons and five 107mm rockets.

The enemy withdrew after 40 minutes leaving 13 dead; U.S. losses were three killed, among them was Sergeant Donald Sidney Skidgel who would be posthumously awarded the Medal of Honor. At 15:40 soldiers from the 1st Infantry Division at Firebase Gela northwest of Lai Khê detonated an explosive device killing eight.

At 15:30 helicopter gunships of the 12th Combat Aviation Group attacked an enemy squad 7 miles north of Củ Chi and directed artillery fire onto the position. Six secondary explosions occurred; 38 dead PAVN/VC were seen in the strike area among eight destroyed structures.

The enemy withdrew at 10:15 leaving 14 dead, five individual weapons, one 60mm mortar and one RPG launcher. At 13:15 a unit of the 2nd Brigade, 25th Infantry Division and a unit of the ARVN 49th Regiment, 25th Division engaged an enemy force 8 miles northeast of Trảng Bàng, supported by artillery, helicopter gunships and airstrikes. The enemy withdrew at 16:00 leaving 36 dead and 15 AK-47s. At 16:30 a unit of the 2nd Brigade, 1st Cavalry Division found the bodies of nine PAVN killed by airstrikes the previous day 6 miles south of Phước Bình. At 21:45 a patrol of the 3rd Brigade, 82nd Airborne Division ambushed a PAVN platoon 8 miles southwest of Bến Cát killing one and capturing one individual weapon.

The enemy withdrew at 13:30 leaving 18 dead and one individual weapon. During the fighting a UH-1 Command and Control helicopter and an AH-1 collided and both crashed killing all ten personnel on the UH-1 including the 3rd Brigade commander Colonel Dale Crittenberger and the commanding officer of the 5th Battalion, 60th Infantry Regiment , Lieutenant colonel Leo Sikorski. Both crewmen of the AH-1 were also killed. At 19:50 a unit of the 2nd Brigade, 1st Infantry Division engaged an enemy force 9 miles east of Lai Khê, the enemy withdrew an hour later leaving ten dead and one captured and four individual weapons.

The PAVN/VC withdrew leaving one dead and a munitions cache was found in the bunkers; U.S. losses were one killed.

The enemy withdrew at 16:10 leaving 20 dead and two captured.

The enemy withdrew at 16:30 leaving 14 dead.

Thirty minutes later other helicopters received fire in the same area and called in further artillery strikes killing another five PAVN/VC.

At 12:30 an armored unit of the 25th Infantry Division engaged an enemy force 2 miles west of Phú Cường supported by airstrikes, the enemy withdrew after an hour leaving 11 dead and seven AK-47s. At 22:45 in the same area a PBR killed a further nine PAVN/VC crossing the river.

At 04:45 mechanized infantry of the 2nd Brigade, 25th Infantry Division and ARVN armored cavalry and infantry from the 49th Regiment, 25th Division in a night defensive position 9 miles north-northeast of Củ Chi received a ground probe. The units responded with their weapons supported by helicopter gunships and an AC-47. The enemy withdrew at 05:05 leaving ten dead and four AK-47s. One airstrike caused a massive secondary explosion resulting in a  smoke column. The enemy withdrew at 11:00 leaving 24 dead and a large munitions cache including 75 107mm rockets and 25 antitank mines. At 21:05 a unit of the 2nd Brigade, 25th Infantry Division detected ten PAVN/VC on their perimeter and directed artillery fire onto the area killing seven. At 22:40 a unit of the 2nd Brigade, 25th Infantry Division engaged 25 PAVN/VC 9 miles southwest of Bến Cát, the enemy withdrew at 01:30 leaving 16 dead.

The enemy withdrew at 05:55 leaving 13 dead and one captured and one individual weapon. The enemy withdrew at 16:20 leaving 30 dead and ten individual weapons; U.S. losses were one killed. The enemy withdrew at 17:50 leaving 26 dead and three individual weapons.

On 28 September at 00:30 a unit of the 2nd Brigade, 25th Infantry Division in a night defensive position 9 miles northwest of Củ Chi detected 20 PAVN/VC moving towards them and directed artillery fire onto the area killing ten.

At 21:00mechanized infantry of the 1st Brigade, 25th Infantry Division detected 20 PAVN/VC outside their perimeter 11 miles northwest of Tây Ninh and directed artillery fire onto the area, seven dead were seen in the strike area.

Cumulative operational results to the end of September were 28,535 PAVN/VC killed, 4,077 captured and 7,180 individual and 1,684 crew-served weapons captured. U.S. losses were 1,605 killed.

October
At 12:30 a unit of the 1st Brigade, 1st Infantry Division engaged an enemy company 6 miles southeast of Dầu Tiếng, the enemy withdrew at 18:45 leaving nine dead; U.S. losses were three killed.

At 10:30 the enemy withdrew leaving 14 dead. Two observation helicopters were hit by ground fire with one crashing; U.S. losses were one killed. At 16:50 a unit of the 2nd Brigade, 1st Cavalry Division operating 4 miles southeast of Sông Bé found the bodies of seven PAVN/VC killed a week earlier.

At 20:30 a unit of the 2nd Brigade, 25th Infantry Division supported by artillery and helicopter gunships engaged 20 PAVN/VC 6 miles northeast of Trảng Bàng, the enemy withdrew at 23:00 leaving 15 dead.

Helicopter gunships and airstrikes attacked the area and six PAVN/VC dead were seen in the strike area.

An OH-6 was shot down in Biên Hòa Province. At 18:30 helicopter gunships from the 1/9th Cavalry received fire 9 miles northeast of Lộc Ninh, the gunships engaged the firing position and directed artillery fire onto the area, five PAVN/VC dead were seen in the strike area.

The aerorifle company was landed at the crash site and engaged enemy forces. A UH-1 was also shot down nearby. The enemy withdrew at 16:30 leaving 15 dead.

Air cavalry troops from the 25th Infantry Division later searched the area finding 19 PAVN/VC dead among five destroyed bunkers. At 23:25 infantry from the 3rd Brigade, 25th Infantry Division and RF troops engage an enemy squad 6 miles south-southwest of Go Dau Ha, the enemy withdrew after a few minutes leaving five dead and two individual weapons. A patrol from the brigade engaged a further four PAVN/VC killing three and capturing one. The prisoner stated that his unit was planning to attack a nearby brigade firebase. At 00:50 on 13 October the firebase was hit by mortar and rocket fire, the defenders returned fire supported by artillery, helicopter gunships and an AC-119. The enemy withdrew at 02:40 leaving two dead, one AK-47 and three RPG rounds.

Soon afterwards in the same area another gunship received fire and returned fire and directed artillery and airstrikes onto the location killing 12 PAVN/VC and destroying a bunker.

At 11:20 a light observation helicopter of the 1/9th Cavalry received fire 300m north of the earlier contact and returned fire and directed artillery fire onto the position killing five.

At 21:45 a patrol from the 1st Brigade, 25th Infantry Division engaged 30 PAVN/VC 6 miles northeast of Go Dau Ha, the enemy withdrew after 40 minutes leaving nine dead.

At 19:35 a unit of the 1st Brigade, 25th Infantry Division engaged 6–8 PAVN/VC 6 miles northeast of Go Dau Ha killing six.

At 18:00 a unit of the 3rd Brigade, 9th Infantry Division operating 11 miles west of Tân An received fire and returned fire supported by U.S. Navy helicopter gunships, the enemy withdrew at 19:45 leaving six dead and five individual weapons. A USAF OV-10 was shot down in Biên Hòa Province killing both crewmen.

At 15:00 a unit of the 199th LIB operating 6 miles southeast of Xuân Lộc found a weapons cache containing 22 individual and one crew-served weapons. At 15:20 a unit of the 2nd Brigade, 1st Cavalry Division received 25 rounds of 82mm mortar fire and returned fire supported by artillery, helicopter gunships and airstrikes. The enemy withdrew after 30 minutes leaving 14 dead and one AK-47; U.S. losses were five killed. The enemy withdrew at 18:30 but 10 minutes later a UH-1 and an AH-1 were hit by ground fire in the area. PAVN/VC losses were two killed and U.S. losses were two killed. At 20:15 a mechanized unit of the 1st Brigade, 1st Infantry Division and U.S. Navy PBRs killed nine PAVN/VC in the water 9 miles southeast of Dầu Tiếng.

The enemy withdrew at 18:00 leaving seven dead; U.S. losses were one killed.

The enemy withdrew at 17:45 leaving 18 dead and two AK-47s; U.S. losses were one killed. At 15:20 a unit of the 2nd Brigade, 25th Infantry Division engaged 5–7 PAVN/VC 7 miles west-southwest of Bến Cát killing five and capturing one and three AK-47s. At 16:30 a unit of the 2nd Brigade, 25th Infantry Division engaged an enemy unit 6 miles west-southwest of Bến Cát killing ten and capturing 2. At 19:30 a U.S. Navy PBR attacked eight PAVN/VC attempting to cross the Saigon River 7 miles west of Bến Cát killing all seven. At 22:00 a patrol from the 3rd Brigade, 9th Infantry Division engaged an enemy force 7 miles southeast of Tân An killing 15.

The unit was supported by artillery, helicopter gunships and airstrikes and later by a mechanized infantry unit of the Brigade. The enemy withdrew at 18:15 leaving 47 dead and 12 individual and three crew-served weapons; U.S. losses were ten killed. Artillery, helicopter gunship and air support was provided and the enemy withdrew at 18:00 leaving 26 dead; U.S. losses were two killed.

At 11:40 a unit of the 1st Brigade, 1st Infantry Division found a weapons cache 5 miles south of Dầu Tiếng containing 29 individual weapons, ten light machineguns, 300 grenades and a radio.

Artillery, helicopter gunship and airstrikes were provided and the enemy withdrew at 14:30 leaving 15 dead and one captured. At 13:35 a unit of the 3rd Brigade, 1st Infantry Division found a weapons cache 6 miles northwest of Bến Cát containing 97 SKS, 28 carbines, 11 submachineguns, two light machineguns and 114 RPG rounds.

Helicopter gunships and PBRs provided support and the enemy withdrew leaving four dead. The enemy withdrew at 18:45 leaving six dead and one crew-served weapon. At 15:15 a helicopter gunship from the 1/9th Cavalry  received fire 15 miles east-northeast of Phước Bình and returned fire and directed artillery and airstrikes on the site, 12 dead were seen in the strike area. At 18:20 a unit of the 1st Brigade, 25th infantry Division engaged 10–15 PAVN/VC 9 miles northeast of Go Dau Ha killing five and capturing three individual weapons.

At 15:10 a unit of the 3rd Brigade, 9th Infantry Division engaged an enemy force 7 miles east-southeast of Tân An killing six. At 22:10 a U.S. Navy PBR attacked an enemy force 9 miles south-southeast of Dầu Tiếng killing nine.

The enemy broke contact at 15:10 but the unit pursued and reengaged until the enemy withdrew at 16:30 leaving 12 dead and one captured and three individual weapons.

Artillery, helicopter gunship and airstrikes were provided and the enemy withdrew at 15:00 leaving 22 dead; U.S. losses were one killed.

Aftermath
The operation concluded on 31 October 1969. Results of the operation were 41,803 PAVN/VC killed and 3,299 captured (U.S body count); U.S. losses were 1,533 killed. The operation was immediately followed by Operation Toan Thang IV by the same units in the same operational area.

References

1969 in Vietnam
Battles and operations of the Vietnam War in 1969
Battles and operations of the Vietnam War
Battles involving the United States
Battles involving Vietnam
History of Bình Dương province
History of Bình Phước Province
History of Đồng Nai Province
History of Ho Chi Minh City
History of Long An Province
History of Tây Ninh Province